Andrew of Carniola (1399 – November 13, 1484) was a Roman Catholic archbishop from Carniola, in present-day Slovenia.

Andrew of Carniola was a Dominican friar. In 1476, through the aid of Emperor Frederick III, he became bishop of Carniola and lived at Laibach. He was an advocate of a general council of bishops as head of the Catholic church, rather than the Papacy.

He attempted but failed to be appointed Cardinal in 1478 by the Pope. In 1482, he traveled to Switzerland and attempted to convene a general council of bishops. As a result, he was excommunicated by the Pope and held in prison. He died during his incarceration, allegedly through suicide.

References

1399 births
1484 deaths
Carniolan Roman Catholic priests
Members of the Dominican Order
People excommunicated by the Catholic Church
Clergy from Ljubljana
Dominican bishops
15th-century Roman Catholic priests